Radien-pardne or Raediengiedte is a Sami god, the son of Radien-attje and Raedieahkka in Sami mythology.  

He is an active god with the task to perform the orders of his passive father.

References 

Sámi gods